The ceremonial and metropolitan county of Greater Manchester is divided into 27 parliamentary constituencies—16 borough constituencies and 11 county constituencies. At the 2019 general election in Greater Manchester, Labour won 18 seats and the Conservatives won 9.

Constituencies

2010 boundary changes
Under the Fifth Periodic Review of Westminster constituencies, the Boundary Commission for England decided to reduce the number of seats in Greater Manchester from 28 to 27, leading to significant changes in the city of Salford, where the three constituencies of Eccles, Salford and Worsley were abolished and replaced by the two constituencies of Salford and Eccles, and Worsley and Eccles South. Manchester, Blackley was replaced with Blackley and Broughton.

Former boundaries

Current boundaries

Proposed boundary changes 
See 2023 Periodic Review of Westminster constituencies for further details.

Following the abandonment of the Sixth Periodic Review (the 2018 review), the Boundary Commission for England formally launched the 2023 Review on 5 January 2021. Initial proposals were published on 8 June and, following two periods of public consultation, revised proposals were published on 8 November 2022. Final proposals will be published by 1 July 2023.

The commission proposed that Greater Manchester be considered as a sub-region of the North West Region, retaining a total of 27 constituencies. However, there would be some significant changes to realign boundaries to revised ward boundaries and ensure electorates are within the statutory range. Denton and Reddish would be broken up and Manchester Rusholme re-established, resulting in major re-configurations of the Manchester Central and Manchester Gorton constituencies, with the latter being renamed Gorton and Denton. Other boundary changes would result in name changes as follows:

The following constituencies are proposed:

Containing electoral wards in the borough of Bolton
Bolton North East
Bolton South and Walkden (part)
Bolton West
Containing electoral wards in the borough of Bury
Bury North
Bury South (part)
Containing electoral wards in the city of Manchester
Gorton and Denton (part)
Manchester Blackley (part)
Manchester Central (part)
Manchester Rusholme
Manchester Withington
Wythenshawe and Sale East (part)
Containing electoral wards in the borough of Oldham
Manchester Central (part)
Oldham East and Saddleworth
Oldham West and Royton
Containing electoral wards in the borough of Rochdale
Heywood
Manchester Blackley (part)
Rochdale
Containing electoral wards in the city of Salford
Bolton South and Walkden (part)
Bury South (part)
Salford
Worsley and Eccles (part)
Containing electoral wards in the borough of Stockport
Cheadle
Hazel Grove
Stockport
Containing electoral wards in the borough of Tameside
Ashton-under-Lyne
Gorton and Denton (part)
Stalybridge and Hyde
Containing electoral wards in the borough of Trafford
Altrincham and Sale West
Stretford and Urmston
Wythenshawe and Sale East (part)
Containing electoral wards in the borough of Wigan
Leigh and Atherton
Makerfield
Wigan
Worsley and Eccles (part)

Results history
Primary data source: House of Commons research briefing - General election results from 1918 to 2019

2019 
The number of votes cast for each political party who fielded candidates in constituencies comprising Greater Manchester in the 2019 general election were as follows:

Percentage votes 

11983 & 1987 - SDP-Liberal Alliance

* Included in Other

Seats 

11983 & 1987 - SDP-Liberal Alliance

Maps

Historical representation by party
A cell marked → (with a different colour background to the preceding cell) indicates that the previous MP continued to sit under a new party name.

See also
 List of parliamentary constituencies in the North West (region)
 List of United Kingdom Parliament constituencies

Notes

References

Greater Manchester
Politics of Greater Manchester
Parliamentary constituencies in Greater Manchester
Parliamentary constituencies